Janet F. Werker  is a researcher in the field of developmental psychology. She researches the foundations of monolingual and bilingual infant language acquisition in infants at the University of British Columbia's Infant Studies Centre. Her research has pioneered what are now accepted baselines in the field, showing that language learning begins in early infancy (even before birth) and is shaped by experience across the first year of life.

Werker received her Ph.D. in psychology at the University of British Columbia in 1982. She is a Canada Research Chair and Killam Professor at the University of British Columbia and is the recipient of the 2015 SSHRC Gold Medal. On 29 December 2017, Werker was named an Officer of the Order of Canada, "for her internationally renowned contributions to our understanding of speech perception and language acquisition in infants."  In 2019, she was named one of four recipients of a William James Fellow Award from the Association for Psychological Science. Most recently, Werker was elected a member of the National Academy of Sciences, widely considered to be one of the highest honours a scientist can receive.

Research

Werker uses both behavioural and neuroimaging (particularly NIRS and ERP) methodology to identify maturational milestones that make it possible for children to begin the process of language acquisition. She has investigated how maternal depression and treatment for it can affect timing of language development in children.
Directions in future research include identifying whether cultural cues, such as ethnicity, influence bilingual children's ability to keep their two languages distinct, and how watching talking faces, in addition to hearing speech, influences acquisition.

Biography

Werker completed her BA in psychology and social relations at Harvard University in 1974. 
She then went to the University of British Columbia for graduate work under Richard Tees.  She attributes her interest in language acquisition to living in Vancouver, where most children grow up in bilingual households.

Werker has been named a Fellow of the Royal Society of Canada, and a Fellow of the American Association for the Advancement of Science, as well as of the American Academy of Arts and Sciences and Association for Psychological Science.

Selected publications
D. Choi, L. Batterink, A. Black, K. Paller and J.F. Werker, "Prelingual infants discover statistical word patterns at similar rates as adults: Evidence from neural entrainment," Psych. Sci., vol. 31, no. 9, pp. 1161–73, 2020.
A.G. Bruderer, D.K. Danielson, P. Kandhadai and J.F. Werker, "Sensorimotor influences on speech perception in infancy," PNAS, vol.112, no. 44, pp. 13531-6, 2015.
J.F. Werker and T.K. Hensch, "Critical Periods in Speech Perception: New Directions," Annu. Rev. Psych., vol. 66, pp. 173–196, 2015.
P. Kandhadai, D.K. Danielson and J.F. Werker, "Culture as a binder for bilingual acquisition," Trends Neurosci. Educ., vol. 3, pp. 24–7, 2014.
W.M. Weikum et al., "Prenatal exposure to antidepressants and depressed maternal mood alter trajectory of infant speech perception," PNAS, vol. 109, no. 2, pp. 17221–7, 2013.

References

External links
UBC Infant Studies Centre (Janet F. Werker's research laboratory)
Janet F. Werker's Departmental Webpage

Living people
Year of birth missing (living people)
Fellows of the American Academy of Arts and Sciences
Fellows of the Royal Society of Canada
Canadian psychologists
Canadian women psychologists
University of British Columbia alumni
Harvard College alumni
Academic staff of the University of British Columbia
20th-century Canadian women scientists
21st-century Canadian women scientists
Fellows of the American Association for the Advancement of Science
Fellows of the Association for Psychological Science
Developmental psycholinguists
Fellows of the Cognitive Science Society
Officers of the Order of Canada
Members of the United States National Academy of Sciences